"Ella y Yo" is Aventura's third single from their fourth studio album God's Project and features reggaeton singer Don Omar. The song is also in Don Omar's compilation album, Da Hitman Presents Reggaetón Latino.

Music video
Romeo and Don are having drinks in a bar. Don is telling Romeo about a woman he has been seeing that is cheating on her husband and how bad he feels. Meanwhile, Romeo is saying how he and his wife have a perfect relationship, and that Don should continue to fight for this woman because her husband does not rule her heart. Don then admits the woman he has been seeing is Romeo's wife, making Romeo sad and perplex, going away and saying they both betrayed him.

Track listings

CD single 
"Ella Y Yo"
"Ella Y Yo" (Mexican Radio Mix)

Chart performance

All-time charts

Awards
In the 2006 Latin Billboard Music Awards, the song was nominated for Hot Latin Song of the Year by Vocal Duet or Collaboration, losing to "La Tortura" by Shakira and Alejandro Sanz. Nonetheless, it was awarded for Tropical Airplay Song of the Year by a Duo or Group.

Michael Stuart version

"Ella y Yo" was covered by Michael Stuart on his album, Back to da Barrio, and features fellow Puerto Rican salsa singer Tito Rojas.

Chart performance

References

Aventura (band) songs
2005 singles
Don Omar songs
Songs written by Romeo Santos
2005 songs
Songs written by Don Omar